National Airways Gabon was an airline based in Libreville, Gabon. It operated passenger services. It was established and started operations in 2001, and rebranded in 2009 as Nationale Regionale Transport.

Fleet 
As of January 2005, the National Airways Gabon fleet included:
 1 Fokker F27 Mk300

References

Defunct airlines of Gabon
Airlines established in 2002
Airlines disestablished in 2009
Companies based in Libreville
Gabonese companies established in 2002